The 2022–23 Israeli Basketball State Cup, for sponsorships reasons the Migdal State Cup, was the 63nd edition of the Israeli Basketball State Cup, organized by the Israel Basketball Association.

On 3 January, 2023, the Israel Basketball Association held the draw for the Quarterfinals. The draw for the Semifinals held on 16 January, 2023.

Qualified teams
The top eight ranking teams after the first rotation (11 rounds) of the 2022–23 Israeli Basketball Premier League regular season qualified to the tournament.

Bracket

Source:

Quarterfinals

Semifinals

Final

References

2022
Cup